The Bermuda Triangle was a themed indoor water ride at the Sea World theme park on the Gold Coast, Australia. In 2013, the ride was replaced by Storm Coaster, a Mack Rides water coaster.

The Sea World ride has a replica (named Bermuda Triangle: Alien Encounter) that still operates in Movie Park Germany to this day, though it was given an Area 51 retheme in 2019 titled Area 51 - Top Secret.

History

In 1980, Sea World opened a set of bumper boats located in a small lake in the centre of the Viking's Revenge Flume Ride. In 1987, these bumper boats were removed to aid in the construction of Lassiter's Lost Mine. Lassiter's Lost Mine was an indoor flume ride where guests would experience the flooding of a mine. The ride was built for only A$3 million - compared to a Disney estimate of A$20 million. Sea World's parent company, Village Roadshow Theme Parks, opened Looney Tunes Studio Tour at Warner Bros. Movie World on 3 June 1991, which utilised the same in-house ride system used on Lassiter's Lost Mine. In April 1993, Lassiter's Lost Mine closed. Less than one year later on 31 March 1994, the Bermuda Triangle opened and was sponsored by Pauls (31 March 1994-????) and Norco Co-operative (31 March 1994 – 18 October 2010). Alan Griffith Architect formed a strong working relationship with Warner Bros. International Recreation Enterprises on the ride. The ride utilised the same ride system as the original Lassiter's Lost Mine ride. The ride system was controlled by ASI systems from Anitech Systems Inc. The ride had easily spotted sensors that would trigger the animatronics' movements and voices in the ride when a boat passed them from below. The ride's theming, special effects, props and audio-animatronics were designed, supplied and installed by Alder Constructions, Sanderson Group and Sally Corporation. After opening, the Bermuda Triangle is cited as a major contributor to an increase in attendance.

On 30 June 1996, The Bermuda Triangle opened with Warner Bros. Movie World Germany. The ride was identical to the version that opened in Australia two years prior. Zeitgeist Design and Production's Ryan Harmon served as the Director of Show Development for Warner Bros. International Recreation Enterprises, where he conceived, wrote, and managed the design team for Warner Bros. Movie World Germany's worth of rides, shows and attractions, including Das Bermuda Dreieck. Alan Griffith Architect, Alder Constructions and Sanderson Group were also involved in the ride's development. Like Bermuda Triangle, Das Bermuda Dreieck had easily spotted sensors that would trigger the animatronics' movements and voices in the ride when a boat passed them from below. The ride was manufactured by Intamin, and its theming was designed by Warner Bros. Movie World Germany. The audio-animatronics featured in the ride were designed by Garner Holt Productions. The sound, light and movements are controlled by an ASI system from Anitech Systems Inc. The ride operated during the Halloween Horror Fest as Knott's haunted Mountain. On 3 April 2004, Warner Bros. Movie World Germany was acquired by StarParks. On 19 March 2005, Movie Park Germany opened with Das Bermuda Dreiecks name being changed to Bermuda Triangle: Alien Encounter, as a result of this acquisition. The ride's special effects weren't sufficiently tested and therefore didn't operate until Parques Reunidos' acquisition of Movie Park Germany on 17 May 2010. In 2006, the red-brown volcanoes were renovated. Their colors were changed to grey, and orange flowing lava was added.

Since the ride's opening in 1994, Bermuda Triangle had several features removed. Bermuda Triangle originally featured a revolving load and unload platform which increased the ride's capacity. This was decommissioned in 2005 due to safety concerns. In 2008, during the construction of Jet Rescue, the gas pipeline that spits fire from the volcano's top was damaged and never repaired, thus rendering the volcano dormant. Later, the pre-show was decommissioned and special effects were broken and never fixed. For example, some of the NTSC CRT video projection screens in the ride clearly displayed "No Signal" or "Replace Lamp" messages.

On 18 October 2010, the Bermuda Triangle closed for routine maintenance until 30 November 2010. In late November, Sea World dropped the reopening date and has instead stated, "Bermuda Triangle is presently closed while we continue to develop new and exciting attractions at Sea World." In early December 2010, the maintenance page was changed for a third time to read, "Bermuda Triangle is temporarily closed." A few days later, Sea World stated on their Facebook page that the Bermuda Triangle had been permanently closed to make way an exciting new future attraction. After sitting dormant for close to one and a half years, Sea World applied for a permit to demolish the ride and the interior of the show building. Once the permit was granted, demolition began in August 2012.

On 10 December 2012, the boats used in the Bermuda Triangle were put up for auction at Village Roadshow Studios. On 2 December 2013, the ride was replaced by Storm Coaster.

In 2015, one of the volcanoes for Bermuda Triangle: Alien Encounter (which was merely a decoration) and the bamboo on the queue area were demolished and removed to make room for Star Trek: Operation Enterprise. After the closure of another Movie Park Germany attraction, Ice Age Adventure, on 1 November 2016, the boats used in that ride were moved to Bermuda Triangle: Alien Encounter, and are used as additional boats for that ride.

Ride

Queue and Pre-show
Riders joined an undercover queue which was located between the final splashdown and Jet Rescue. A staff member in a Coast Guard uniform appeared at the front of the queue and ushered the group of riders up a set of stairs into the pre-show room. This same staff member then gave guests a briefing about the upcoming ride. This was followed by a second story briefing on a television monitor from three navy officials (played by actors). The riders were to assume the role of researchers being sent out to investigate several mysterious volcanoes that have emerged from the sea within the Bermuda Triangle. At the end of the pre-show guests were ushered out another door and back down stairs towards the ride's station in the centre of the outdoor portion of the ride.

Ride
Up to 16 guests would board a Research Probe vessel which would begin a slow journey towards the smaller of the two volcanoes. Throughout the ride, pre-recorded audio of the navy officials was played through the boat's speakers chronicling its findings. At the entry riders would go up a small conveyor belt hill into the volcano. The boat would then rapidly descend the hill and splashdown in the main show building. The boat would follow a long corridor, and while the pre-show coast guards discuss getting the boat riders out of the volcano, cracks would appear to form in the mechanical ceiling descending from above, giving the illusion the crew are now trapped inside. 

The ride continued with the boat flowing slowly around several show scenes and animatronics. The riders would pass a display of 1940s fighter planes being dismantled by a group of aliens, as well as a set of force fields with abducted civilians from various periods of history trapped inside. The audio commentary from the boat speakers would reveal that one of the coast guards, Clark is affiliated with the aliens and subsequently disappears to join with them. Clark's face is shown on a large television display warning the aliens that the volcano is about to erupt. As the ride progresses, the boat passes more animatronic alien displays, and the illusion of an alien spaceship disappearing using the visual effect of Pepper's Ghost.

The boat would come to a halt at what seems like a dead end in front of a large "window" of one of the volcanoes erupting (actually a video screen of an animated volcano). As it erupts, a falling stone cracks the screen and water begins to "flood" into the room. Through the use of a turntable, the boat is turned away from the screen as a set of doors open behind the boat before it begins to travel backwards into another room. Here, several special effects were used to simulate the flooding of the volcano's interior. Audio from Clark within the volcano warns the riders of the aliens' return while the boat is then turned towards the main conveyor lift hill. It would rise towards to the top of the volcano where fireballs would rise. The boat would then descend the final drop and exit via the second, larger volcano.

Post-ride
After the ride, guests would disembark their boats onto the unload station before going up and over a bridge to get off the island station. Once back at ground level, guests were able to purchase on-ride photos taken during the final drop of the ride.

Gallery

See also

 Looney Tunes River Ride, a defunct ride which utilised the same ride system
 Movie Park Germany, where a version of the same ride still operates to this day.

References

External links

Animatronic attractions
Dark rides